César Rodríguez (born 28 August 1973) is a Puerto Rican weightlifter. He competed in the men's bantamweight event at the 1996 Summer Olympics.

References

1973 births
Living people
Puerto Rican male weightlifters
Olympic weightlifters of Puerto Rico
Weightlifters at the 1996 Summer Olympics
Place of birth missing (living people)
20th-century Puerto Rican people